Robert Prosky (born Robert Joseph Porzuczek, December 13, 1930 – December 8, 2008) was an American actor. He became a well-known supporting actor in the 1980s with his roles in Thief (1981), Christine (1983), The Natural (1984), and Broadcast News (1987).

Prosky's other notable movies include Gremlins 2: The New Batch (1990), Hoffa (1992), Mrs. Doubtfire (1993), Last Action Hero (1993), Miracle on 34th Street (1994), Dead Man Walking (1995), and Mad City (1997).  His most notable television role was of Sgt. Stan Jablonski on the TV police drama Hill Street Blues.

Early life
Prosky, a Polish American, was born in the Manayunk neighborhood of Philadelphia, Pennsylvania, to Helen (Kuhn) and Joseph Porzuczek. His father was a grocer and butcher. He was raised in a working-class neighborhood and studied at the American Theatre Wing, later graduating from Temple University. He performed at Old Academy Players, a small theater in the East Falls section of Philadelphia, adjacent to Manayunk. He also served in the U.S. Air Force during the Korean War, but got a hardship discharge to help with the family store when his father died suddenly.

Career
Prosky appeared in Thief, Christine, Hanky Panky, The Natural, Hoffa, Broadcast News, Things Change, The Great Outdoors, Loose Cannons, Rudy, Mrs. Doubtfire, Green Card, and Dead Man Walking. He also appeared as Will Darnell, the man who owned the auto repair shop where Arnie Cunningham (Keith Gordon) rebuilds the possessed car "Christine" in the film John Carpenter's Christine based on Stephen King's novel.

In addition to appearing in films, he appeared in many television shows, as a regular on Hill Street Blues, Danny, and Veronica's Closet. Prosky also portrayed Jake "the Snake" Connolly on a two-part 1991 episode of Coach. He was considered for the role of Martin Crane in Frasier and later made a guest appearance in the series as a reclusive writer who befriended the character. He was offered the role of Coach Ernie Pantusso on Cheers, but turned it down; he later portrayed Rebecca Howe's father on the same show. His role in Veronica's Closet was likely a nod to this, as in both shows he would play the father of a character portrayed by Kirstie Alley.

In addition to his film and television career, he appeared in numerous productions at the Arena Stage in Washington, D.C., most notably as Willy Loman in Death of a Salesman. Prosky often performed at Arena Stage with over 100 stage credits to his name at that theatre alone. He played Shelly Levene in the 1984 Chicago and Broadway production of David Mamet's Pulitzer Prize-winning play Glengarry Glen Ross. He was also a board member of the Cape May Stage in Cape May, New Jersey.

Prosky appeared in two films, Dead Man Walking and The Chamber, with actor Raymond J. Barry. He received or was nominated for two Tony awards, two Helen Hayes awards, an Emmy, the Drama Desk award, and the American Express Tribute To An American Actor. He continued to perform on stage and present lectures on his long career at universities, film festivals, for theater benefits, business groups and on cruises.

Personal life
In 1960, he married Ida Hove with whom he had three sons, Stefan, John and Andrew Prosky, the latter two being actors as well.

Death
Prosky died on December 8, 2008, five days before his 78th birthday while living in the Capitol Hill neighborhood of Washington, D.C. His son John said that the cause was complications of heart surgery at the Washington Hospital Center. The New York Times described him: "a craggy-faced, heavyset character actor who, after 23 years in regional theater, became a familiar face on Broadway, in movies and on television, notably as a gruff desk sergeant in the later years of Hill Street Blues."

Playbill described him: "He was best suited to playing salt-of-the-earth characters, sometimes with a mischievous or slightly sinister edge."

Filmography

 The Brink's Job (1978) - Cop in Police Lineup (uncredited)
 Thief (1981) - Leo
 World War III (1982) - General Rudenski 
 Hanky Panky (1982) - Hiram Calder
 Monsignor (1982) - Bishop Walkman
 The Lords of Discipline (1983) - LTC Thomas "The Bear" Berrineau
 Christine (1983) - Will Darnell
 The Keep (1983) - Father Fonescu
 The Natural (1984) - The Judge (team owner)
 Outrageous Fortune (1987) - Stanislav Korzenowski
 Big Shots (1987) - Keegan
 Broadcast News (1987) - Ernie Merriman
 The Murder of Mary Phagan (1988, Miniseries) - Thomas Edward Watson
 The Great Outdoors (1988) - Wally
 Things Change (1988) - Joseph 'Don Giuseppe' Vincent
 The Heist (1989) - Dancer
 Loose Cannons (1990) - Von Metz
 Gremlins 2: The New Batch (1990) - Grandpa Fred
 Funny About Love (1990) - Emil Thomas "E.T." Bergman
 Green Card (1990) - Brontë's Lawyer
 Age Isn't Everything (1991) - Grandpa Irving
 Far and Away (1992) - Daniel Christie
 Hoffa (1992) - Billy Flynn
 Last Action Hero (1993) - Nick
 Rudy (1993) - Father John Cavanaugh
 Mrs. Doubtfire (1993) - Jonathan Lundy
 Miracle on 34th Street (1994) - Judge Henry Harper
 The Scarlet Letter (1995) - Horace Stonehall
 Dead Man Walking (1995) - Hilton Barber
 The Chamber (1996) - E. Garner Goodman
 Mad City (1997) - Lou Potts
 The Lake (1998) - Herb
 Dudley Do-Right (1999) - Inspector Fenwick
 Eye See You (2002) - McKenzie
 Death to Smoochy (2002) - Network Chairman (uncredited)
 Suits on the Loose (2005) - Bishop Hollister
 The Skeptic (2008) - Father Wymond (final film role)

Television
 Hill Street Blues (1984–1987) - Sgt. Stan Jablonski
 Murder She Wrote (1987) - Bishop Patrick Shea
 The Murder of Mary Phagan (1988) - Tom Watson 
 From the Dead of Night (1989) - Dr Walter Hovde
 A Green Journey (1990) - Bishop Baker
 Coach (1991) - Jake "The Snake" Connolly
 Cheers (1992) - Navy Captain Franklin Howe
 Frasier (1996) - T.H. Houghton
 Veronica's Closet (1997-1998) - Pat Chase
 ER (2007) - Wayne Rutley

Stage

References

External links

 Robert Prosky Papers at GMU
 
 
 
 
 AP Obituary in The Philadelphia Inquirer

1930 births
2008 deaths
Male actors from Philadelphia
American male film actors
American male stage actors
American male television actors
American people of Polish descent
Drama Desk Award winners
Temple University alumni
Burials at Rock Creek Cemetery
20th-century American male actors
21st-century American male actors